Wang Zili (born June 14, 1968) is a retired Chinese chess player. He was awarded the title Grandmaster by FIDE in 1995, becoming the fifth from China.

Career

Wang gained the grandmaster title in 1995. He was twice national champion, in 1988 and 1999. He participated for the China national chess team in five Chess Olympiads (1988–1996) with an overall record of 52 games played (+23, =18, -11); one World Men's Team Chess Championship (1989) with an overall record of 9 games played (+3, =2, -4); and three Asian Team Chess Championships (1991–1995) with an overall record of 24 games played (+14, =8, -2). In 1997 Wang qualified for the FIDE World Chess Championship knockout tournament in Groningen. He was beaten in the first round by Utut Adianto.

He reached his highest FIDE rating of 2603 in July 2000, when he was ranked worldwide at 86th.

References

External links

Wang Zili games at 365Chess.com
Wang Zili at Chessmetrics
Wang Zili FIDE rating history at benoni.de
Wang Zili - New In Chess. NICBase Online.

1968 births
Living people
Chess grandmasters
Chess players from Anhui
People from Bozhou